Grant High School may refer to the following schools:

Australia
Grant High School (Mount Gambier), South Australia

United States
Grant Community High School in Fox Lake, Illinois
Grant County High School in Dry Ridge, Kentucky
Grant High School (Louisiana), part of the Grant Parish School Board in Louisiana
Grant High School (Los Angeles), in Valley Glen
Grant High School (Portland, Oregon)
Grant Union High School (John Day, Oregon)
Grant Union High School (Sacramento, California)
U. S. Grant High School (Oklahoma), in Oklahoma City